Oussama Bouyaghlafen (born 27 April 1998) is a Dutch professional footballer who plays as a winger for Tweede Divisie club De Treffers.

Club career

Den Bosch
Bouyaghlafen played youth football for Rotterdam clubs Sparta AV, SVV, Alexandria '66, before moving to the youth academy of Willem II in 2013. The following season, he joined the FC Den Bosch youth department.

He made his professional debut in the Eerste Divisie for FC Den Bosch on 21 October 2016 in 3–1 away loss to VVV-Venlo, where he came on as a substitute in the 83rd minute for Stefano Beltrame. He signed a contract extension until June 2020 with Den Bosch in December 2017, with the option of one additional year.

Almere City
In May 2020, Bouyaghlafen signed a two-year contract with Almere City. He made his debut for the club on 30 August in a 0–0 home draw against MVV, coming on as a substitute for Ilias Alhaft in the 61st minute. Half a month later, on 15 September, Bouyaghlafen scored his first goal for Almere City in a 3–0 home win over TOP Oss. Earlier in the match, he had won a penalty, setting up the 1–0 goal scored by Thomas Verheydt. With Almere City, he reached the play-offs for promotion in his first season, but the team would see themselves defeated by eventual play-off winners NEC in the first round.

After the 2021–22 season, Bouyaghlafen's contract was not extended by Almere City, and he left the club as a free agent.

De Treffers
On 25 July 2022, Bouyaghlafen joined Tweede Divisie club De Treffers.

Personal life
Born in the Netherlands, Bouyaghlafen is of Moroccan descent.

References

External links
 

1998 births
Living people
Footballers from Rotterdam
Association football wingers
Dutch footballers
Dutch sportspeople of Moroccan descent
Eerste Divisie players
Tweede Divisie players
SV SVV players
Willem II (football club) players
FC Den Bosch players
Almere City FC players
De Treffers players